Mont-d'Astarac is a commune in the Gers department in southwestern France.

Geography

History

Its history goes back to the 930s, when it became the first capital of Astarac. It was on the feudal motte, still visible today, that Arnaud Garcia established his castle, having inherited the County of Astarac from his father Count de Gascogne, Garcia Sanchez (called the Crooked), grandson of the count of Castille.
It is worth seeing for its monuments - tower and church - registered among the Historic Monuments of France, and for its beautiful murals dating to the 15th century.

Population

See also
Communes of the Gers department

References

Communes of Gers